Municipal elections was held in West Bengal on 27 February 2022 to elect members of all 108 municipalities in the state. The election to four remaining wards were held in 26 June.

The All India Trinamool Congress had won overwhelming majority of 102 municipalities out of 108. CPI(M) had won 1 municipal body. BJP which was the last largest opposition party in 2021 West Bengal Legislative Assembly election failed to win a single municipality.

Schedule

Contested parties
Other small parties contested in this election like CPI(ML)LIB, GJM etc. They had not made any important result, so we make them out of our report.

Results
The ruling party in the state, Trinamool Congress, had a landslide victory by winning 102 out of 108 municipalities. CPI(M) and newly formed Humro Party were successful to win Taherpur and Darjeeling municipality respectively. The results of the remaining four bodies were found hung which were later won by TMC with the support of independent candidates.

Following is a list of performances of the contested political parties and alliances (on 27 February,2022) :

By-election
Source:

The results of the by election six ward is :

References

Local elections in West Bengal
W